Huttons Ambo is a civil parish in the Ryedale district of North Yorkshire, England. The civil parish of Huttons Ambo consists of the villages of High Hutton and Low Hutton.

History
The villages are mentioned in the Domesday book as Hotun in the Bulford hundred. The lands were divided between  Cnut, son of Karli, Thorkil and Thorbrand son of Kalri. After the Norman invasion, the lands were split between the King and Berengar of Tosny.  The land at Low Hutton owned by the King, has been named Hutton Colswayn, whilst the land near Hutton Hill has been known as Hutton Mynchon. The land at High Hutton has been known as Hutton Bardolf. All these suffixes indicate the names of the landowners of those times. The Colswayn family may have been given the land by the Crown for duties performed guarding York Castle. The titles passed on to the Bolton family. The other lands came into the possession of the Gower family, some of whom held the office of High Sheriff of York, such as Sir Thomas Gower. Memorials to members of this family can seen in the Church.

Hutton, the toponym, derives from the Old English hōh tūn, meaning settlement on or by the hill spur. Ambo, the suffix, is Latin indicating the combination of the two villages into the one parish.

Excavations in the 1950s revealed evidence of 12th- or 13th-century fortified buildings at the south end of the village of Low Hutton near the river. Huttons Ambo lends its name to a specific type of Medieval pottery produced here in the 13th Century consisting of large, unglazed storage jars

Governance
The villages lie within the Thirsk and Malton UK Parliament constituency. It is within the Hovingham & Sheriff Hutton electoral division of North Yorkshire County Council and also in the Derwent ward of Ryedale District Council.

Geography

Since UK Census records began, the highest recorded population in the parish was 445 in 1821. According to the 2001 UK Census the population is 287. Of these, 225 were over sixteen years of age and 125 of them were in employment.  There were 135 dwellings, of which 72 were detached. The Census 2011 showed a population of 270.

There are a total of 17 Grade II Listed Buildings in the parish.

The nearest settlements are Malton  to the north-east and Crambeck  to the south-west.

The villages are situated between the A64 York to Scarborough road and the River Derwent, Yorkshire.

Transport

There used to be a station in the village that was a stop on the York to Scarborough Line run by York and North Midland Railway. Opened in 1845, it closed in 1966.

Religion

The church in High Hutton is dedicated to St Margaret, rebuilt in 1856 on the site of the original building. It is a Grade II Listed Building.

There used to be a Primitive Methodist Chapel in Low Hutton and a Wesleyan Chapel in High Hutton.

References

Villages in North Yorkshire
Civil parishes in North Yorkshire